These are the details of the 2000–01 Oldham Athletic A.F.C. season, who competed in the Football League Second Division.

Season summary
Hopes were high for the Latics at the start of the 2000–01 season after a 4–1 opening day win at home to newly relegated Port Vale, but a run of 11 games without a win saw the club slump to second bottom in the league, making relegation look a real possibility. The signings of veteran winger David Eyres and midfielder Tony Carss gave the side added impetus and the Latics recovered well to again finish comfortably mid-table.

Final league table

 Pld = Matches ; W = Matches won; D = Matches drawn; L = Matches lost; F = Goals for; A = Goals against; GD = Goal difference; Pts = Points
 NB: In the Football League goals scored (F) takes precedence over goal difference (GD).

Results
Oldham Athletic's score comes first

Legend

Football League Second Division

FA Cup

League Cup

Football League Trophy

Players

First-team squad
Squad at end of season

Left club during season

References

Notes

Oldham Athletic A.F.C. seasons
Oldham Athletic